Suze Morrison is a Canadian former politician, who was elected to the Legislative Assembly of Ontario in the 2018 provincial election. She represented the riding of Toronto Centre as a member of the Ontario New Democratic Party, and was the Ontario New Democratic Party's Caucus Critic for both Housing and Women's Issues. She did not run for re-election in 2022.

Background  
Of mixed European and Indigenous heritage, Morrison was born in the Parry Sound District before moving to Toronto in childhood. She took her Bachelor of Applied Arts degree in media studies from Guelph-Humber, and has worked in communications and public relations in the non-profit sector. She first became prominent within the riding as an advocate for community safety after witnessing the drive-by shooting of Lemard Champagnie in Toronto's Regent Park neighbourhood in 2017.

Morrison is a motorsports enthusiast, and competes in autocross events. She is a two-time winner of the Lorna Wilson Ladies Championship, which is awarded by the Western Ontario Sports Car Association.

In June 2021, Morrison came out as bisexual.

Politics 
During the election campaign, she participated alongside Liberal MPP Steven Del Duca and Progressive Conservative MPP Lisa Thompson in Election Brew, a non-partisan event sponsored by Equal Voice and Labatt to increase citizen engagement in politics through a friendly competition to create craft beer brews; Morrison's beer, an India pale ale, won the competition.

She was one of three MPPs of Indigenous heritage elected in 2018, alongside caucus colleagues Guy Bourgouin and Sol Mamakwa.

She served as a member of the Standing Committee on Public Accounts, and as the official opposition critic for housing and women's issues.

Morrison was diagnosed with endometriosis in 2019. As a result, she declined to run for re-election in the 2022 Ontario general election, instead opting to undergo treatment for the disease.

Electoral record

References

Ontario New Democratic Party MPPs
21st-century Canadian politicians
21st-century Canadian women politicians
Living people
Women MPPs in Ontario
Politicians from Toronto
First Nations women in politics
University of Guelph alumni
1988 births
Canadian LGBT people in provincial and territorial legislatures
LGBT First Nations people
Bisexual politicians
Bisexual women
People with Endometriosis
21st-century Canadian LGBT people